The Tucker Telephone is a torture device designed using parts from an old-fashioned crank telephone.  The electric generator of the telephone is wired in sequence to two dry cell batteries so that the instrument can be used to administer electric shocks to another person.  The Tucker Telephone was invented by A. E. Rollins, the resident physician at the Tucker State Prison Farm, Arkansas, in the 1960s.

At the Tucker State Prison Farm, an inmate would be taken to the "hospital room" where he was most likely restrained to an examining table and two wires would be applied to the prisoner. The ground wire was wrapped around the big toe and the "hot wire" (the wire that administers the current of electricity) would be applied to the other toe.  The torture device was also used on genitalia. The crank on the phone would then be turned, and an electric current would shoot into the prisoner's body. Continuing with the telephone euphemisms, 'long-distance calls' referred to several such charges, just before the point of losing consciousness. Often the victim would experience detrimental effects, mainly permanent organ damage and mental health problems. Its use was substantiated until 1968.

There are doubtful reports from American Vietnam War veterans that field phones were occasionally converted into Tucker Telephones which were used by platoon commanders to torture Viet Cong prisoners.

A version of the device is used on a prisoner in the Robert Redford film Brubaker.

A 1974 report by Seth B. Goldsmith, SCD noted "The Tucker telephone not only shocked the toes of the allegedly uncooperative and incorrigible prison-farm inmates of the Arkansas penal system, but it shocked the consciousness of the nation and awakened it to the atrocious conditions inside prisons."

See also 
 Graduated electronic decelerator
 Picana
 Phone call to Putin

References

External links 
Military Medical Ethics Volume 2 Section IV: Medical Ethics in the Military
1967 Newspaper article about the prison

American inventions
Contemporary instruments of torture
Telecommunications equipment
Torture in the United States
Violence against men in Asia
Violence against men in North America